John Hinton may refer to:

Jack Hinton (John Daniel Hinton, 1909–1997), New Zealand soldier awarded the Victoria Cross
John Hinton (rugby) (1860–1931), Wales international rugby union player
John Hinton (baseball) (1876–1920), American baseball player
John Hinton (footballer), English footballer active in the 1910s and 1920s
John Hinton (priest), Archdeacon of Ossory from 1700 to 1713
John Hinton (Dean of Tuam) (1672–1743), Anglican priest in Ireland
John Howard Hinton (1791–1873), English author and Baptist minister
J. M. Hinton (John Michael Hinton, 1923–2000), British philosopher